Events in the year 1973 in Brazil.

Incumbents

Federal government
 President: General Emílio Médici 
 Vice President: General Augusto Rademaker

Governors 
 Acre: vacant
 Alagoas: Afrânio Lages
 Amazonas: João Walter de Andrade
 Bahia: Antônio Carlos Magalhães 
 Ceará: César Cals 
 Espírito Santo: Artur Carlos Gerhardt Santos 
 Goiás: Leonino Caiado 
 Guanabara: Antonio de Pádua Chagas Freitas
 Maranhão: Pedro Neiva de Santana 
 Mato Grosso: José Fragelli 
 Minas Gerais: Rondon Pacheco 
 Pará: Fernando Guilhon 
 Paraíba: Ernâni Sátiro 
 Paraná: Emílio Hoffmann Gomes 
 Pernambuco: Eraldo Gueiros 
 Piauí: Alberto Silva
 Rio de Janeiro: Raimundo Padhila
 Rio Grande do Norte: Jose Pereira de Araújo Cortez 
 Rio Grande do Sul: Euclides Triches 
 Santa Catarina: Colombo Salles 
 São Paulo: Laudo Natel 
 Sergipe: Paulo Barreto de Menezes

Vice governors
 Acre: Alberto Barbosa da Costa 
 Alagoas: José de Medeiros Tavares 
 Amazonas: Deoclides de Carvalho Leal 
 Bahia: Menandro Minahim 
 Ceará: Francisco Humberto Bezerra
 Espírito Santo: Henrique Pretti 
 Goiás: Ursulino Tavares Leão 
 Maranhão: Alexandre Sá Colares Moreira 
 Mato Grosso: José Monteiro de Figueiredo 
 Minas Gerais: Celso Porfírio de Araújo Machado 
 Pará: Newton Burlamaqui Barreira 
 Paraíba: Clóvis Bezerra Cavalcanti 
 Paraná: Jaime Canet Júnior (from 11 August)
 Pernambuco: José Antônio Barreto Guimarães 
 Piauí: Sebastião Rocha Leal 
 Rio de Janeiro: Teotônio Araújo
 Rio Grande do Norte: Tertius Rebelo 
 Rio Grande do Sul: Edmar Fetter 
 Santa Catarina: Atílio Francisco Xavier Fontana 
 São Paulo: Antonio José Rodrigues Filho  
 Sergipe: Adalberto Moura

Events 
11 February – Emerson Fittipaldi wins the 1973 Brazilian Grand Prix at Interlagos.
11 July – Several notable Brazilians are killed when a fire breaks out on Varig Flight 820. Many passengers die of smoke inhalation by the time attempts an emergency landing near Orly in France. The fire, smoke, and crash kill 123 of the 135 people on board.

Births
1 January – Shelda Bede, volleyball player
2 February – Latino, singer-songwriter
22 February – Gustavo Assis-Brasil, guitarist
10 April – Roberto Carlos, footballer
15 April – Emanuel Rego, beach volleyball player
16 June – Veronica Rossi, novelist
19 July – Aílton, footballer
6 August – Vanessa Gerbelli, actress
26 September – Leandro Hassum, actor, comedian, writer & producer
20 October – Rodrigo Faro, TV host, actor & singer
22 November – Eliana Michaelichen Bezerra, TV host, actress & singer
30 November – Angélica Ksyvickis, TV host, actress, singer & businesswoman

Deaths 
17 January – Tarsila do Amaral, modernist artist (b. 1886).
11 July (killed in the crash of Varig Flight 820)
Filinto Müller, politician (b. 1900)
Jörg Bruder, sailor and geology professor (b. 1937) 
Júlio Delamare, sports journalist (b. 1928)

References

See also 
1973 in Brazilian football
1973 in Brazilian television

 
1970s in Brazil
Years of the 20th century in Brazil
Brazil
Brazil